Max Flick (born June 29, 1994) is an American professional soccer player who currently plays as a defender for North Carolina FC in USL League One.

Career

Amateur
Flick grew up in Beaver Falls, Pennsylvania and played for the Pittsburgh Strikers and Century United.

College
Flick played three years of college soccer at Point Park University in Pittsburgh, Pennsylvania.

Professional
Flick played two seasons for the Fort Pitt Regiment of the National Premier Soccer League. In 2018, Flick was a member of the All-Conference XI for the NPSL Midwest Region.

Flick signed with Pittsburgh Hotspurs of the NSPL in 2019.

Flick signed with North Carolina FC of USL League One on April 15, 2021.

References

1994 births
Living people
American soccer players
Association football defenders
College men's soccer players in the United States
National Premier Soccer League players
North Carolina FC players
People from Beaver Falls, Pennsylvania
Pittsburgh Riverhounds U23 players
Point Park University alumni
Soccer players from Pennsylvania
Sportspeople from the Pittsburgh metropolitan area
USL League One players
USL League Two players